Ondřej Bureš (24 September 1966 – 23 June 1999) was a Czech swimmer. He competed in two events at the 1988 Summer Olympics.

References

External links
 

1966 births
1999 deaths
Czech male swimmers
Olympic swimmers of Czechoslovakia
Swimmers at the 1988 Summer Olympics
Sportspeople from Prague
Universiade medalists in swimming
Universiade bronze medalists for Czechoslovakia